You Can Always Duck is a 1943 thriller novel by the British writer Peter Cheyney. It is the ninth in his series of novels featuring the FBI agent Lemmy Caution. The action takes place in wartime London where Caution is on the trail of a gang of black marketeers who have got mixed up in espionage. It was one of a number of films and novels of the period that made use of the booming black market for their setting.

References

Bibliography
 James, Russell. Great British Fictional Detectives. Remember When, 21 Apr 2009.
 Pitts, Michael R. Famous Movie Detectives. Scarecrow Press, 1979.
 Reilly, John M. Twentieth Century Crime & Mystery Writers. Springer, 2015.
 Roodhouse, Mark. Black Market Britain: 1939-1955. OUP Oxford, 2013.
 Server, Lee. Encyclopedia of Pulp Fiction Writers. Infobase Publishing, 2014.

1943 British novels
Novels by Peter Cheyney
British thriller novels
Novels set in London
British crime novels
William Collins, Sons books